Chryseobacterium gwangjuense  is a Gram-negative, strictly aerobic, rod-shaped and non-motile bacteria from the genus of Chryseobacterium which has been isolated from soil from the Gwangju province in Korea.

References

Further reading

External links
Type strain of Chryseobacterium gwangjuense at BacDive -  the Bacterial Diversity Metadatabase

gwangjuense
Bacteria described in 2013